The L.L. Tisdale Parkway is a  freeway that runs through northwest Tulsa. The highway is named in honor of local Tulsa pastor, Rev. L.L. Tisdale. The parkway was originally known as the Osage Expressway, as part of a cancelled freeway project to Pawhuska, the capitol of the Osage Nation.

Route description
The expressway begins as a limited access highway at an interchange with I-244/US 64/US 75/US 412 just outside Downtown Tulsa. The freeway runs north weaving into Osage County before returning to Tulsa County in Tulsa. The expressway becomes a surface street just north of the Gilcrease Expressway before ending at West 36th Street North in Northern Tulsa.  It is the Osage Nation's only expressway.

History
Plans for the expressway were almost abandoned in 1983 by the Oklahoma Department of Transportation due to lack of funding and other roads needing the funds. The highway was later funded entirely by the residents of Tulsa. Construction began on the Osage Expressway in 1986 and was completed in 1993, running from Interstate 244 to Apache Street. The expressway was extended further north in 1995 to 36th Street North, with construction finishing in 1997. With the northern extension, the Osage Expressway was renamed L.L. Tisdale Parkway in honor of the Reverend L.L. Tisdale.

Junction list

References

Roads in Oklahoma
Transportation in Tulsa, Oklahoma